

Sigeferth was a medieval Bishop of Lindsey.

Sigeferth was consecrated before 996. He died after 1004. This was a revival of the see, which had lapsed during the Danish invasions.

Citations

References

External links
 

Bishops of Lindsey
11th-century deaths
Year of birth unknown